The 2011 Survivor Series was the 25th annual Survivor Series professional wrestling pay-per-view (PPV) event produced by WWE. It took place on November 20, 2011, at Madison Square Garden in New York City. It was also the first one to take place in Madison Square Garden since the 2002 event, as well as the first Survivor Series held following the end of the first brand extension in August.

Seven matches were contested at the event, six of which were broadcast live on pay-per-view. The main events from this installment of Survivor Series pay-per-view would have a lasting effect on the next year in the WWE. In the main event, The Rock, in his first WWE in-ring match since 2004, teamed up with his WrestleMania XXVIII opponent John Cena to defeat The Miz and R-Truth. A predominant match saw Big Show defeat World Heavyweight Champion Mark Henry by disqualification. In another predominant match on the card, CM Punk was victorious over Alberto Del Rio by submission to win the WWE Championship, a reign that would continue until January 27, 2013 and become the sixth longest in the company's history.

The event garnered 281,000 pay-per-view buys, up from 244,000 buys the previous year's event.

Production

Background
Survivor Series is an annual gimmick pay-per-view (PPV), produced every November by WWE since 1987—in April 2011, the promotion ceased going by its full name of World Wrestling Entertainment, with "WWE" becoming an orphaned initialism. The second longest running pay-per-view event in history (behind WWE's WrestleMania), it is one of the promotion's original four pay-per-views, along with WrestleMania, Royal Rumble, and SummerSlam, referred to as the "Big Four". The event is traditionally characterized by having Survivor Series matches, which are tag team elimination matches that typically pits teams of four or five wrestlers against each other. The 2011 event was the 25th event in the Survivor Series chronology and was scheduled to be held on November 20, 2011, at Madison Square Garden in New York City. It was also the first Survivor Series held ince the end of the first brand split in August. Tickets sold out in only 90 minutes.

The 2011 event was hyped in New York City by a huge fan interaction event outside of Madison Square Garden two days before the event, which included the first look at the new WWE '12 video game, a signing with CM Punk, and a performance from the band Oleander. The event was attended by over 16,000 WWE fans, including one who received two tickets to the sold out event by The Rock. Also in attendance were Zack Ryder and Jimmy Hart, who gave a bus tour of New York to 150 fans who won tickets via WWE.com in the weeks leading to the event.

Storylines
Survivor Series featured professional wrestling matches involving different wrestlers from pre-existing scripted feuds, plots, and storylines that developed on WWE's television programs, Raw and SmackDown. Wrestlers portrayed heroes or villains as they followed a series of events that built tension and culminated in a wrestling match or series of matches.

The main event involved WrestleMania XXVIII opponents John Cena and The Rock teaming against the Awesome Truth (The Miz and R-Truth). After losing to Alberto Del Rio the previous month at Vengeance due to interference by The Miz and R-Truth. Cena decided to face both of them with Zack Ryder as his partner, but Miz and R-Truth ambushed Ryder before the match, in which they beat Cena down. Former Interim General Manager John Laurinaitis booked Cena with a match against Miz and Truth at Survivor Series with a partner of his choice, with Cena choosing his WrestleMania XXVIII opponent, The Rock, as his partner. Billed as the most charismatic team of all time, The Rock accepted his offer the following week.

Three months prior at SummerSlam, Alberto Del Rio cashed in his Money in the Bank contract against WWE Champion CM Punk to win the title. Punk got a rematch at Hell in a Cell but it was a Triple Threat match and John Cena was the champion going into the match. Punk requested to have another one-on-one rematch for the championship. Del Rio objected but accepted the challenge after Punk locked him into an Anaconda Vise.

The event also included World Heavyweight Champion Mark Henry defending his title against Big Show. The two had wrestled each other the previous month at Vengeance, but during the match the ring had collapsed, leaving both men unable to continue. A rematch was scheduled for Survivor Series, with a reinforced ring being set up.

A Survivor Series elimination match pitting Team Orton, consisting of Randy Orton, Sheamus, Sin Cara, Mason Ryan, and Kofi Kingston, against Team Barrett, consisting of Wade Barrett, Cody Rhodes, Dolph Ziggler, Jack Swagger and Hunico, was also scheduled for the event. Christian was originally part of Team Barrett but was pulled from the team after suffering an ankle injury during WWE's European Tour.

Event

Preliminary matches
In the first match, Dolph Ziggler defended the United States Championship  against John Morrison Ziggler performed a Zig Zag on Morrison to retain the title. After the match, Zack Ryder attacked Ziggler.

Next, Beth Phoenix defeated Eve Torres in a Lumberjill match to retain the Divas championship. Phoenix won by pinning Eve after a Glam Slam from the top rope.

In the third match, Team Barrett, consisting of Wade Barrett, Cody Rhodes, Hunico, Jack Swagger and Dolph Ziggler, faced Team Orton, consisting of Randy Orton, Sheamus, Kofi Kingston, Mason Ryan and Sin Cara. Ziggler was the first man eliminated after an RKO. Sin Cara was eliminated after sustaining a legitimate injury. Ryan was then eliminated after Cross Rhodes by Rhodes. Kingston was eliminated by Wasteland by Barrett. Sheamus was disqualified after not breaking the referee's 5 count near the ropes. In frustration, Sheamus Brogue Kicked Swagger, who was then pinned by Orton. Hunico was next eliminated after Orton executed a RKO in mid-air on him. Following a distraction by Rhodes, Orton was pinned by Barrett, giving Team Barrett the win and leaving Rhodes and Barrett as the survivors.

Next, Mark Henry defended the World Heavyweight Championship against Big Show. During the match, Henry tackled Big Show through the barricade, but Big Show got into the ring before the 10-count. Big Show then performed a diving elbow drop to Henry. Big Show then attempted his finisher, the WMD but Henry performed a low blow to Big Show, causing a disqualification. After the match Big Show placed a steel chair over the leg of Henry and gave him a leg drop onto the chair.

In the main event, Alberto Del Rio defended the WWE Championship against CM Punk. Howard Finkel was the special ring announcer for Punk. During the match, there were many reversals and counters to the two men's various finishers and submission holds. The match resulted in Punk winning via submission with Del Rio submitting to the Anaconda Vice. Punk celebrated with the crowd after the match. This would be the start of Punk’s reign that would last for 434 days.

Main event
The main event saw John Cena and The Rock face The Miz and R-Truth. Throughout the match, Cena was targeted and was almost pinned many times.  After R-Truth and John Cena took each other out of the match, the Rock performed a spinebuster followed by the People's Elbow to pin the Miz.  After the match, The Rock performed the Rock Bottom on Cena.

Reception
Dave Meltzer wrote that the main event had "The biggest big match feel in WWE since the John Cena vs CM Punk encounter from Money in the Bank earlier that year." The event was released December 20, 2011, on DVD by WWE Home Video, and went on to be the highest selling pay-per-view on DVD that year behind Wrestlemania.

Results

 The lumberjills were: AJ, Aksana, Alicia Fox, Brie Bella, Kaitlyn, Kelly Kelly, Maxine, Natalya, Nikki Bella, Rosa Mendes and Tamina.

Survivor Series elimination tag team match

References

External links
Official Survivor Series website

2011
Events in New York City
2011 in New York City
Madison Square Garden
Professional wrestling in New York City
2011 WWE pay-per-view events
November 2011 events in the United States